Pussyfoot is a 2008 comedy film directed by Dusan Sekulovic.

Synopsis
The film tells the story of a bristly-faced resident expat, Irwin, and his friends as they experience their second coming-of-age in New York City. For Irwin, there are “women” and then there are “girls”: women want to get married and girls just want to have fun. For the single Anny, there are three types of men: married, gay and idiots. Polish polka bars, confusing self-help books and a mythical hooker who never sleeps with her clients confound the friends’ American journey.

Cast
The cast includes:
 Atul Singh
 Chiara de Luca
 Christian Georgescu
 Irwin Pelkalvski
 Jason Bittle
 Jeffrey Coyne
 Lael Logan
 Lex Alexander
 Lora Grillo
 Michael De Nola
 Nikoleta Sekulovic
 Paula Panzarella
 Ramona Ganssloser
 Shana Chanel
 Vinny Muffoletto

Awards and recognition
The film screened at the 2008 Fort Lauderdale International Film Festival, was a 2008 Moondance International Film Festival Finalist and was named the Audience Award Feature Film at the 2008 Chashama Film Festival.

References

External links

Official site

2008 films
2008 comedy films
American comedy films
2000s English-language films
2000s American films